Alexander Lauder may refer to:
Sir Alexander Lauder of Blyth (died 1513), provost of Edinburgh 
Alexander Lauder (bishop), Scottish bishop
Alexander Lauder (chemist) (1870–1943)
Alex Lauder, Scottish footballer
Sir Alexander Lauder, 4th Baronet (1698–1730)